Clarence High School, also known as Clarence Central High School or, formerly, Clarence Senior High School, is a public high school located in Clarence, Erie County, New York, United States. It is the only high school operated by the Clarence Central School District. Kenneth J. Smith is principal.

Clarence Central School District
Established in 1949 by the New York State Board of Regents. The district includes six schools in the Clarence area, east of Buffalo, New York. Matt Frahm, Ed.D. is superintendent of schools.

In 2006 and 2007, Clarence stayed in the first spot in the Business First School rankings. In 2009, Clarence was ranked 4th out of 131 Western New York high schools.

High school
 Clarence High School (Built in 1950), Building Principal - Kenneth J. Smith

Middle school
Clarence Middle School (Built in 1963), Building Principal - Ashley Dreibelbis

Elementary schools
Clarence Center Elementary (Built in 1956), Principal - Colleen J. Coggins
Ledgeview Elementary (Built in 1961), Principal - Keith E. Kuwik
Harris Hill Elementary (Built-in 1953), Principal - Margaret Aldrich
Sheridan Hill Elementary (Built-in 1958), Principal - Jenna Arroyo

Notable alumni
Kevyn Adams, NHL forward for the Phoenix Coyotes; alternate captain of the Carolina Hurricanes in 2006; Current General Manager for the Buffalo Sabres
Laura Aikin, American operatic coloratura soprano
Nikki Dinki, chef; finalist on Food Network Stars; TV show host
Lauren Fix, automotive expert, television host and personality 
Neil Haskell, contemporary dancer; original cast member for Hamilton on Broadway
Katie MacFarlane, former professional women's basketball player
Pam MacKinnon, stage director; winner of the 2013 Tony Award for Best Direction of a Play
Mark Murphy, athlete; co-captain of Super Bowl XVII Champions Washington Redskins, Pro Bowl 1982 and 1983; current President/CEO of the Green Bay Packers; graduated in 1973
Chad Michael Murray, actor
Jason Vieaux, classical guitarist; winner of 2015 Grammy for Best Classical Instrumental Solo 
Patrick Wilson, drummer; member of the rock band Weezer

References

Public high schools in New York (state)
Schools in Erie County, New York
School districts established in 1949